NJFX, also known as New Jersey Fiber Exchange, is a Wall Township, NJ-based data center and subsea cable landing station operator.  The company offers Tier 3 data center, meet-me room and colocation services, and a cable landing station on a 58 acre campus.

History
NJFX was founded by Gil Santaliz, a telecommunications executive who in 2008 sold metro dark fiber provider 4Connections to Optimum Lightpath, a subsidiary of NY cable operator Cablevision (now Altice USA).  Tata Communications was a founding partner of NJFX.

NJFX opened a meet-me room (MMR) within Tata Communication's Wall, NJ subsea cable landing station (CLS).  One of Tata's cables terminating in the cable landing station is the Seabras-1 undersea cable, which links North America and Brazil, with a landing point in Sao Paulo. Tata's TGN Atlantic subsea cable also lands in Wall Township, connecting to Highbridge, Somerset, United Kingdom.  As the MMR operator, NJFX managed the network connections between its own customers and those of Tata Communication's CLS.

In September 2015, NJFX announced they would be constructing a 64,000 sq ft Tier III data center adjacent to Tata's CLS, providing direct access to their European and South America subsea cables.  Design would be done by Boston-based Bala Consulting Engineers.

In January 2016, voice and data network provider Windstream announced it was extending its 100 Gigabit Ethernet (100G) network from NJFX's presence at the CLS to Ashburn, Virginia's Internet hub. 

In January 2017, its Tier III center was completed.  In March, NJFX announced they were adding an additional data center on their campus. 

In September 2018, the company announced that the HAVFRUE transatlantic submarine network cable would be landing at its Wall, NJ cable landing station. The cable was planned to run between New Jersey and Denmark, with branches to Norway and Ireland.

In March 2019, Amazon Web Services signed an agreement with Norwegian infrastructure company Bulk Infrastructure to use the upcoming HAVFRUE cable at its United States termination points at NJFX's campus, along with termination points at Dublin, Norway and Western Denmark.

In December 2020, the 7851km HAVFRUE cable went into service as the first new undersea cable traveling from Northern Europe to the US in nearly 20 years. It terminated at the NJFX facility in Wall, NJ, and its capacity services were marketed by operator Aqua Comms under the name American Europe Connect-2 (AEC-2).

Services

NJFX operates a data center campus in Wall Township, NJ, offering meet-me room, data center and colocation services to business customers.  The center is adjacent to a substation operated by Jersey Central Power & Light (JCP&L), a subsidiary of energy giant FirstEnergy.  The NJFX campus also contains a cable landing station serving several subsea cables, including the HAVFRUE AEC-2 cable connecting to Northern Europe, as well as Tata's TGN1 and TGN2 cables, and Seaborn Networks' Seabras cable. Notable clients include Google, Facebook, US telecommunications company CenturyLink (now Lumen Technologies), Verizon Communications, and Amazon Web Services.

References

External links
 NJFX homepage

Internet hosting
Data centers
Internet architecture
Wall Township, New Jersey